Dreghorn Barracks are located in Edinburgh, Scotland. The barracks are situated at the southern edge of the city, south of Colinton, and adjacent to the Edinburgh City Bypass.

History
The present barracks complex was largely built in 1937–1939 to designs by William Alexander Ross. The barracks were upgraded in 1989–1992, with the addition of several new buildings. The four original buildings are protected as a category C(s) listed building. 

The barracks were built in the grounds of Dreghorn Castle, a 17th-century mansion built by Sir William Murray, Master of Work to the Crown of Scotland. The castle was extended around 1805 by Archibald and James Elliot. The castle was acquired by the War Office in 1893, and was eventually demolished in 1955.

A monument outside the barracks on Redford Road commemorates the insurgent covenanters of the Pentland Rising who were defeated at the Battle of Rullion Green in 1666. The monument was erected in 1884 by R A Macfie of Dreghorn House, and incorporates columns taken from the 18th-century Edinburgh Royal Infirmary, designed by William Adam and demolished the previous year.
 In the 19th century it had been the home of Robert Andrew Macfie.

As part of the Future Force 2020 budgetary announcement in July 2011, RAF Kirknewton was to have been developed into a major Army base to host a Multi-Role Brigade and Dreghorn Barracks was earmarked for disposal. However plans to develop Kirknewton as an Army barracks were scrapped in March 2013 and Dreghorn Barracks will now be retained.

Dreghorn is one of the three barracks comprising the City of Edinburgh Garrison.

Current units
Current units stationed at the barracks include:
3rd Battalion, The Rifles.
Band of the Royal Regiment of Scotland
Edinburgh Troop, 521 EOD Squadron, 11 Explosive Ordnance Disposal and Search Regiment, Royal Logistic Corps

See also
 Redford Barracks, located close to Dreghorn Barracks, in Colinton

References

External links
 Edinburgh HIVE, Dreghorn Barracks, Ministry of Defence
 

Installations of the British Army
Barracks in Scotland
Category C listed buildings in Edinburgh
1939 establishments in Scotland
Military installations established in 1939